The following list outlines the major equipment in service with the Egyptian Army.

Individual equipment

Infantry weapons

Small arms

Anti-tank and missile

Recoilless rifles

Anti tank systems

Man-portable air defence

Mortars

Training mortars

Vehicles

Tanks

Infantry fighting vehicles

Armored personnel carriers, MRAPS

Artillery and missile systems 
The Egyptian ballistic missile development program started in the late 1950s after the construction of Jabal Hamzah ballistic missile test and launch facility to conduct test fires on Al Zafir and Al Kahir SRBMs. The RS-120 Tactical Ballistic Missile Program is still in the developmental stage and should be shortly replacing the Frog-7 and supplementing the Sakr 80; by having a range of 120 km, it would be considered as an intermediate system between the battlefield range ballistic missile system and the theater ballistic missile system. Should, however, there be a dramatic change in its political climate and financial resources, Egypt possesses the technological and personnel resources to produce a Scud B/C and Project-T missiles.

Engineering vehicles 

 PZM-2 Ditcher (36)

Amphibious bridging 
 BMK-T Bridging Boats (48)
 BMK-130M Bridging Boats (48)
 BMK-150M Bridging Boats (48)

Utility vehicles

Logistic vehicles 

 ZU-23-2 upgraded twin 23 mm stationary or towed radar guided AA gun system (manufactured locally) (650)

Other equipment 
 BK-3 Helmet
 Czechoslovakian M53 helmet
 OR-201
 SSh-68
 Airman Battle Uniform
 Desert Camouflage Uniform
 Desert Battle Dress Uniform
 MultiCam
 U.S. Woodland
 Lizard (camouflage)
 Ratnik (program)

Gallery

References

Notes

Bibliography 
 

Military equipment of Egypt
Egyptian Army
Equipment